Quentin Lamar Richardson (born April 13, 1980) is an American former professional basketball player who was formerly the director of player development for the Detroit Pistons of the National Basketball Association (NBA). Nicknamed "Q-Rich", he played professionally for 13 seasons for the Los Angeles Clippers, Phoenix Suns, New York Knicks, Miami Heat, and Orlando Magic. He won the NBA Three-Point Contest in 2005.

Early years
Richardson was born in Chicago, Illinois to Lee and Emma Richardson where he attended Whitney Young High School. In 1998, he led the Dolphins to the state AA title.  In 2006, Richardson was voted as one of the 100 Legends of the IHSA Boys Basketball Tournament, a group of former players and coaches in honor of the 100 year anniversary of the IHSA boys basketball tournament.

Collegiate career
Richardson played college basketball for DePaul University where he averaged 17.9 points and 10.2 rebounds per game in two seasons. He became the only player in school history to have 1,000+ points, 500+ rebounds and 100+ three-point field goals. As a freshman, he earned both the Conference USA Player of the Year and Freshman of the Year. Richardson declared for the NBA draft after his sophomore year in 2000.

Professional career

Los Angeles Clippers (2000–2004)
Richardson was drafted by the Los Angeles Clippers with the 18th pick of the 2000 NBA draft. He was selected after fellow Clippers Darius Miles and Keyon Dooling. Richardson  would star in a documentary with Miles entitled The Youngest Guns which chronicled their first three seasons in the NBA with the Clippers. On New Year's Eve 2003, Richardson posted a career-high 44 points in a 120 - 104 victory over the Denver Nuggets. It was the only time in Richardson's 13-year career where he scored 40 points or more. Richardson spent four seasons with the Clippers before becoming a free agent.

Phoenix Suns (2004–2005)
In 2004, Richardson later signed with the Phoenix Suns as a free agent.

The 2004–05 season was a big one for not only Richardson, but the Suns as well. He set a new Suns single-season record for three-point field goals, eclipsing the previous record of 199 set by Dan Majerle. He finished the season with a league-leading 631 three-point attempts, and 226 three-point field goals, co-leading the league with Kyle Korver. Richardson also set a Suns franchise record with nine threes against the New Orleans Hornets on December 29, 2004. Richardson would also go on to win the NBA All-Star Three-Point Shootout that same season. The Suns finished the regular season with a league-best 62 wins and 20 losses. He made his playoff debut with the Suns in 2005 who would eventually lose to the eventual champion San Antonio Spurs in the Western Conference Finals.

New York Knicks (2005–2009)
Richardson was traded from the Suns, along with 2005 draft pick Nate Robinson, to the New York Knicks in exchange for Kurt Thomas and Dijon Thompson in the offseason.
His first three seasons in New York were largely hampered by nagging injuries—the most serious being a chronic back condition—which limited him to 55, 49, and 65 games played respectively. His injury situation finally stabilized during the 2008–2009 season, when he remained healthy enough to appear in all, but seven games. This does not include two additional DNP-CDs (Did Not Play – Coach's Decision) that he received; one on February 28, 2009, against the Miami Heat and a second on March 10, 2009, against the Milwaukee Bucks.

Miami Heat (2009–2010) 
On the 2009 draft day, Richardson was traded to the Memphis Grizzlies in exchange for Darko Miličić. His stint at the Grizzlies only last three weeks before he was traded again to the team that drafted him, the Los Angeles Clippers, in exchange for Zach Randolph. His second stint with the Clippers only lasted for three days. On July 20, 2009, he was traded to the Minnesota Timberwolves for Sebastian Telfair, Mark Madsen, and Craig Smith.

After less than a month at Minnesota, 
Richardson was traded for the fourth time in the 2009 off-season, this time to the Miami Heat for Mark Blount.

Orlando Magic (2010–2012)
In 2010, Richardson signed with the Orlando Magic. He remained with the team until October 2012, when he was waived. During his 2-year stint with Orlando, Richardson played 105 games and averaged 4.4 points, 0.7 assists and 2.9 rebounds while shooting 31.5% from the 3pt-line.

Return to New York (2013)
On April 16, 2013, Richardson signed with the New York Knicks for the remainder of the season, joining that team for a second time. He only played one regular season game, scoring five points in twenty nine minutes on 1 for 11 shooting, but brought down ten rebounds.  He did appear in five playoff games, hitting two three-pointers in New York's 26-point blowout win of the Pacers in Game 2 of the Eastern Conference semifinals.

On July 10, 2013, Richardson was part of a trade package to the Toronto Raptors, along with center Marcus Camby, forward Steve Novak, a first-round draft pick in 2016, and two second-round draft picks in 2014 and 2017, in exchange for forward Andrea Bargnani.

Richardson's final NBA game was played on May 11, 2013, in Game 3 of the Eastern Conference Semi-Finals versus the Indiana Pacers. Richardson played less than 2 minutes and the only stat he recorded was 1 rebound. 
On September 3, 2013, Richardson was waived by the Raptors.

Post-playing career
On August 7, 2014, it was announced that Richardson was named the director of player development for the Detroit Pistons.

 he worked for the Bally Sports Orlando Magic broadcast team.

He co-hosts the Knuckleheads podcast with Darius Miles for The Players' Tribune .

Accomplishments

IHSA State Championship, Whitney Young (1998)
McDonald's All American (1998)
Conference USA Player of the Year (1999)
Conference USA Freshman of the Year (1999)
USBWA National Freshman of the Year (1999)
NBA All-Star Weekend Three-Point Shootout champion (2005)
100 Legends of the IHSA Boys Basketball Tournament

NBA career statistics

Regular season 

|-
| style="text-align:left;"| 
| style="text-align:left;"| L.A. Clippers
| 76 || 28 || 17.9 || .442 || .331 || .627 || 3.4 || .8 || .6 || .1 || 8.1
|-
| style="text-align:left;"| 
| style="text-align:left;"| L.A. Clippers
| 81 || 0 || 26.6 || .432 || .381 || .765 || 4.1 || 1.6 || 1.0 || .3 || 13.3
|-
| style="text-align:left;"| 
| style="text-align:left;"| L.A. Clippers
| 59 || 13 || 23.2 || .372 || .308 || .685 || 4.8 || .9 || .6 || .2 || 9.4
|-
| style="text-align:left;"| 
| style="text-align:left;"| L.A. Clippers
| 65 || 64 || 36.0 || .398 || .352 || .740 || 6.4 || 2.1 || 1.0 || .3 || 17.2
|-
| style="text-align:left;"| 
| style="text-align:left;"| Phoenix
| 79 || 78 || 35.9 || .389 || .358 || .739 || 6.1 || 2.0 || 1.2 || .3 || 14.9
|-
| style="text-align:left;"| 
| style="text-align:left;"| New York
| 55 || 43 || 26.2 || .355 || .340 || .670 || 4.2 || 1.6 || .7 || .1 || 8.2
|-
| style="text-align:left;"| 
| style="text-align:left;"| New York
| 49 || 47 || 33.1 || .418 || .376 || .692 || 7.2 || 2.2 || .7 || .1 || 13.0
|-
| style="text-align:left;"| 
| style="text-align:left;"| New York
| 65 || 65 || 28.3 || .359 || .322 || .682 || 4.8 || 1.8 || .7 || .2 || 8.1
|-
| style="text-align:left;"| 
| style="text-align:left;"| New York
| 72 || 51 || 26.3 || .393 || .365 || .761 || 4.4 || 1.6 || .7 || .1 || 10.2
|-
| style="text-align:left;"| 
| style="text-align:left;"| Miami
| 76 || 75 || 27.4 || .431 || .397 || .732 || 4.9 || 1.2 || .9 || .2 || 8.9
|-
| style="text-align:left;"| 
| style="text-align:left;"| Orlando
| 57 || 19 || 16.8 || .341 || .288 || .750 || 3.1 || .7 || .4 || .1 || 4.4
|-
| style="text-align:left;"| 
| style="text-align:left;"| Orlando
| 48 || 3 || 18.0 || .376 || .347 || .833 || 2.6 || .8 || .6 || .1 || 4.5
|-
| style="text-align:left;"| 
| style="text-align:left;"| New York
| 1 || 0 || 29.0 || .091 || .250 || 1.000 || 10.0 || 1.0 || .0 || .0 || 5.0
|- class="sortbottom"
| style="text-align:center;" colspan="2"| Career
| 783 || 486 || 26.5 || .397 || .355 || .718 || 4.7 || 1.5 || .8 || .2 || 10.3

Playoffs 

|-
| style="text-align:left;"| 2005
| style="text-align:left;"| Phoenix
| 15 || 15 || 37.6 || .403 || .390 || .639 || 5.1 || 1.7 || 1.3 || .2 || 11.9
|-
| style="text-align:left;"| 2010
| style="text-align:left;"| Miami
| 5 || 5 || 29.8 || .400 || .409 || .800 || 3.8 || 1.6 || 1.6 || .2 || 9.8
|-
| style="text-align:left;"| 2011
| style="text-align:left;"| Orlando
| 6 || 1 || 16.3 || .533 || .500 || 1.000 || 2.5 || .3 || .2 || .2 || 3.8
|-
| style="text-align:left;"| 2012
| style="text-align:left;"| Orlando
| 5 || 0 || 14.8 || .333 || .286 || .000 || 4.4 || .4 || .2 || .0 || 2.4
|-
| style="text-align:left;"| 2013
| style="text-align:left;"| New York
| 5 || 0 || 2.8 || .333 || .400 || .000 || .6 || .0 || .0 || .0 || 1.2
|- class="sortbottom"
| style="text-align:center;" colspan="2"| Career
| 36 || 21 || 25.0 || .404 || .397 || .674 || 3.8 || 1.0 || .8 || .1 || 7.5

Personal life
In 1992, Richardson lost his mother to breast cancer, his grandmother to natural causes, and also his brother, Bernard, who was shot and killed in Chicago, aged 23. Another of Richardson's brothers, Lee Jr., was murdered on December 5, 2005, in Chicago during a robbery. Richardson has another older brother, Cedric, and one older sister Rochelle. Richardson is also the cousin of multi entrepreneur Dean Richardson.

Richardson was engaged for 14 months to R&B singer Brandy. They split in September 2005.

Richardson has appeared in multiple acting roles, most notably as himself in the 2002 film Van Wilder.

See also 

List of National Basketball Association career 3-point scoring leaders

References

External links

1980 births
Living people
African-American basketball players
American men's basketball players
Big3 players
DePaul Blue Demons men's basketball players
Los Angeles Clippers draft picks
Los Angeles Clippers players
McDonald's High School All-Americans
Miami Heat players
New York Knicks players
Orlando Magic players
Parade High School All-Americans (boys' basketball)
People from Palos Heights, Illinois
Phoenix Suns players
Shooting guards
Small forwards
Basketball players from Chicago
Whitney M. Young Magnet High School alumni
21st-century African-American sportspeople
20th-century African-American people
American men's 3x3 basketball players